Daniel Colliard (14 August 1930 – 2 January 2022) was a French politician. He was a member of the French Communist Party (PCF).

Life and career
Colliard was born to a Catholic family who moved to Le Havre in 1938. During his education, he was a member of Jeunesse Étudiante Chrétienne. He became employed as a cement worker during the 1950s to help reconstruct the city following World War II. He joined the PCF in 1955 and took on responsibilities at the party's headquarters.

When Duroméa resigned on 10 October 1994, Colliard replaced him and became mayor of Le Havre. Colliard was elected to the National Assembly in 1993 and represented Seine-Maritime's 8th constituency from 1993 to 1997. Additionally, he was General Councilor of the Canton of Le Havre-5 from 1976 to 1982.

Colliard died in Le Havre on 2 January 2022, at the age of 91.

References

1930 births
2022 deaths
20th-century French politicians
Deputies of the 10th National Assembly of the French Fifth Republic
French general councillors
Mayors of places in Normandy
French Communist Party members
People from Dieppe, Seine-Maritime